Earthbeat may refer to:

 Earthbeat (The Future Sound of London album), 1992
 Earthbeat (Paul Winter album), 1987